The Swabian Rezat is a 33.3-kilometre-long river in southern Germany (Bavaria). It is the southern, right source river of the Rednitz. It rises in the Franconian Jura hills, near Weißenburg in Bayern. It flows generally north through the towns Weißenburg in Bayern, Ellingen and Pleinfeld. Together with the Franconian Rezat, it forms  the Rednitz in Georgensgmünd.

In its upper course the Rezat is close to the continental water shed between Rhine and Danube. In the 8th century Charlemagne tried to build a canal between Rezat and Altmühl which were only 3 km away from each other. It's not clear if it was finished and used for a short period or not. Its remains can be seen as "Fossa Carolina" or "Karlsgraben" near Treuchtlingen.

Tributaries

The following rivers are tributaries to the river Swabian Rezat (from source to mouth):

Left: Weimersheimer Bach, Mittelbühlgraben, Walkershöfer Weihergraben, Vorderer Troppelgraben, Hinterer Troppelgraben, Banzerbach, Brombach
Right: Felchbach, Ottmarsfelder Graben, Arbach, Iglseebach, Roter Graben

References

 
Rivers of Bavaria
Weißenburg-Gunzenhausen
Rivers of Germany